Michele D'Oppido (born 10 February 1949) is a retired Italian swimmer. He competed at the 1968 Summer Olympics in the 100 m freestyle and 200 m and 400 m individual medley events, but failed to reach the finals. He finished fifth in the 200 m medley at the 1970 European Championships. His brother Antonio was also a competitive swimmer.

References

1949 births
Living people
People from Crotone
Olympic swimmers of Italy
Swimmers at the 1968 Summer Olympics
Italian male freestyle swimmers
Male medley swimmers
Sportspeople from the Province of Crotone